The ambassador of the United States of America to the Russian Federation is the ambassador extraordinary and plenipotentiary from the United States of America to the Russian Federation. Since January 30, 2023, Lynne M. Tracy is serving as the Ambassador Extraordinary and Plenipotentiary.

History 

The United States first established diplomatic relations with the Russian Empire in 1780. Diplomatic relations were broken off in 1917 when the Bolsheviks seized power, and they were not reestablished until 1933. From 1933 to 1991, the United States recognized the Soviet Union. After the collapse of the Soviet Union in 1991, the ambassador's title was changed to Ambassador to the Russian Federation, as Russia is the USSR's direct successor.

List of ambassadors

Russian Empire (1780–1917)

Soviet Union (1933–1991)

Russian Federation (1992–present)

Notes

See also
 Embassy of the United States, Moscow
 Russia–United States relations
 Soviet Union–United States relations
 Russian Empire–United States relations
 Ambassadors of the United States

References
 United States Department of State: Background notes on Russia

External links
 
 United States Department of State: Chiefs of Mission for Russia
 United States Department of State: Russia
 The Ambassadorial Series features in-depth interviews with nine former U.S. ambassadors to Russia and the Soviet Union. {Middlebury Institute of International Studies at Monterey}

 
Russia
United States
United States
Ambassadors
Ambassadors